Hassan Alluqmani (born 7 January 1995) is a Saudi Arabian professional footballer who plays as a midfielder.

Career 
Alluqmani started his career at Al-Wahda and is a product of the Al-Wahda's youth system. On 4 May 2017, Alluqmani made his professional debut for Al-Wahda against Al-Qadsiah in the Pro League, replacing Bandar Baajaj .

Career statistics

Club

References

External links 
 

1995 births
Living people
Saudi Arabian footballers
Al-Wehda Club (Mecca) players
Radwa Club players
Saudi Professional League players
Saudi Fourth Division players
Association football midfielders